The 2008 Marshall Thundering Herd football team represented Marshall University in the 2008 NCAA Division I FBS football season. Marshall competed as a member of the East Division of Conference USA, and played their home games at Joan C. Edwards Stadium. The Thundering Herd were led by fourth-year head coach Mark Snyder. Marshall finished the season with a 4–8 record (3–5).

Before the season, Sports Illustrated ranked Marshall the 115th team in the FBS (out of 120) and predicted they would finish with a 1–11 record. Against 11th-ranked Wisconsin, the Herd led 14–0 in the second quarter, but gave up 51 unanswered points in the remainder of the game. Later in the season, Marshall upset Houston, 37–23, after having led 37–9 earlier in the final period. The following week, they lost in overtime to favorite East Carolina by a field goal, 19–16. Marshall held Rice quarterback Chase Clement to 84 passing yards in the first half, which was tied at 7, but went on to lose, 35–10. In the season closer, they proved competitive for eventual Conference USA runners-up Tulsa.

Schedule

References

Marshall
Marshall Thundering Herd football seasons
Marshall Thundering Herd football